The Dartmoor line is a  railway line in Devon, England. Previously a heritage line, it is owned by Network Rail.

The route was originally part of the London and South Western Railway's route from Exeter to Plymouth, which was opened between 1865 and 1879. In 1968, British Rail closed the line beyond Meldon (two miles beyond Okehampton) as part of the Beeching cuts. The Exeter to Okehampton passenger service was withdrawn by British Rail in 1972. The line itself remained open for freight services from the railway ballast quarry at Meldon.

From 1997 to 2019, the line was operated as a heritage railway by the Dartmoor Railway community interest company. During this time, Great Western Railway ran a public service between Exeter and Okehampton on summer Sundays. Meldon quarry was mothballed in 2011, ceasing the use of the line for freight.

In July 2021, as part of the government's Restoring Your Railway programme, the line was transferred to Network Rail ownership, and regular national rail passenger services began in November of the same year.

History

Construction
Before the line was built it had been leased to the LSWR and an extension authorised to Lidford. In 1864 it was renamed as the Devon and Cornwall Railway (which was absorbed into the LSWR in 1872, before the new line opened) and construction finally started.

The constructors of the line adopted a policy of navigating around natural obstacles, rather than going over or through them as earlier builders had done. The section from Coleford Junction through  to North Tawton is simple and contains a  straight section, but the line soon begins to curve as it climbs the edge at Dartmoor, at a 1 in 77 gradient. The high point of the line is about two miles further, reaching  near Meldon Viaduct.

The LSWR became a part of the new, larger Southern Railway at the Grouping in 1923. This in turn became the Southern Region of British Railways on nationalisation in 1948.

British Rail

At the peak of services through Okehampton in the 1950s, there were twelve or more daily trains in each direction; on summer Saturdays, this could increase with duplicate Atlantic Coast Express services. In the early 1960s, a car transporter train ran between Surbiton and Okehampton on summer Saturdays, bringing holidaymakers and their cars from the London area.

Trains between Exeter and Plymouth via Okehampton were withdrawn from 6 May 1968, leaving a shuttle service to run between Exeter and Okehampton. Okehampton to Exeter passenger services were withdrawn on 5 June 1972.

Between 1972 and 1997, the line was used for railway ballast traffic from Meldon Quarry and occasional freight traffic to the remaining goods yard at Okehampton before its closure. Though the closure of the route was in part to save on the maintenance expenditure of Meldon Viaduct, the structure remained in use as a headshunt for the quarry, given a new layout in 1979 for increased traffic. Occasional charter and special trains were operated to Okehampton and Meldon Quarry during the passenger closure period. The railway reopened to regular passenger services in 1997 with the formation of Dartmoor Railway.

Heritage operation
The Dartmoor line from Coleford Junction to Okehampton was in heritage operation from 1997 to 2019. The origins of the restored Dartmoor Railway lie in British Rail's 1994 sale of Meldon Quarry to Camas Aggregates, a multinational quarrying company, along with the railway line up to its junction with Network Rail at Coleford. A collaboration between Devon County Council, West Devon Borough Council and the Dartmoor National Park Authority led to the creation of a plan to restore and regenerate the line and Okehampton station for tourism purposes, with the county council purchasing the station in 1996 for a nominal price from Camas.

Works to refurbish Okehampton station included renovating the station building, raising the platform, restoring the awning, and converting the goods shed into a youth hostel. Part of the building, which saw a grand reopening on 24 May 1997, was leased to a model shop and buffet, and the Dartmoor Railway began operation in 1997 with a fleet of historic locomotives, coaches, and diesel and electric multiple units, including classes 08, 47, 117, 205, 411, 421 and 438. Steam-hauled charter services also visited occasionally. RMS Locotec was contracted to maintain the line and rolling stock.

Meldon Viaduct, an iron truss bridge about  further up the line from Okehampton, was designated as a scheduled monument and refurbished shortly after the opening of the heritage railway; a new station of the same name, unrelated to any historic station, was built at its eastern end in 2000 for the heritage railway. The track across the viaduct was lifted in 1990 as the structure was assessed to be too weak to take the weight of a train.

In September 2008, British American Railway Services Ltd, a company created by Iowa Pacific Holdings of Chicago, became the new owner of the Dartmoor Railway community interest company. The company announced its intention to develop freight, passenger and tourist services on the railway. Heritage services ran between Okehampton and Meldon Viaduct, extended to Sampford Courtenay, Bow or the Dartmoor Railway–Network Rail boundary on special event days. The former stations at North Tawton and Bow remain closed to passengers: both are privately-owned and have no public access. Themed trains were introduced for special occasions such as Christmas, with names like The Polar Express and The Train to Christmas Town.

The quarry at Meldon was mothballed in 2011, bringing an end to stone freight trains using the line. Heritage train services ceased in December 2019 and, in February 2020, the railway entered administration. Rolling stock based at Okehampton station was moved to Meldon Quarry, with most offered for resale.

Public train services
After the heritage Dartmoor Railway opened in 1997, First Great Western operated a summer Sunday service of four return trips direct from Exeter between May and September, sponsored by Devon County Council.

The service would have run under an open access licence.

Network Rail

On 19 March 2021, it was announced that the Dartmoor Line would reopen to regular, year-round services by the end of the year as the first project delivered as part of the government's "Restoring Your Railway" programme.

Preparatory work began on reopening the railway between Okehampton and Coleford Junction as soon as Government funding was confirmed in March.

In July 2021, Network Rail took over formal ownership of the line from Aggregate Industries, a successor company to Camas, which had been leasing it to the Dartmoor Railway since 1994. It also acquired the northern part of Okehampton station from Devon County Council for £1, leaving the southern side with the council.

The frequency has increased to hourly from May 2022, with more trains serving Exeter Central.

Services are run using s although s and / 'Turbos' are also cleared to run on the route.

Route

The station buildings at Bow and North Tawton remain as private residences, while Sampford Courtenay and Meldon Viaduct stations are unused. Beyond Meldon, 11 miles of the former track bed to Lydford can be followed on foot or cycle along what is now called The Granite Way.

Passenger volume
The following station usage table shows only the National Rail service operated by Great Western Railway. It does not include the heritage trains operated on the railway up until 2019.

The reopened line carried 250,000 in a little over its first year of operation.

References

Bibliography

External links

The Dartmoor Railway Association

2021 establishments in England
Heritage railways in Devon
Rail transport in Devon
Railway lines in South West England
Scenic railway lines in Devon and Cornwall
Standard gauge railways in England